Morris Museum, Morristown, New Jersey established in 1943
Morris Museum of Art, Augusta, Georgia  established in 1985
Morris Graves Museum of Art, Eureka, California named after Morris Graves 
Morris Motors Museum